Yazd's codes are 54 and 64. In public cars, Taxis and Governal cars the letter is always the same. But in simple cars this letter (ب) depends on the city. 74 used to be the reserve code for Yazd, however, as the codes used in Razavi Khorasan exhausted, 74 was assigned there, and is now in use in Mashhad.

54 
54 is Yazd county's code and all of the letters are for Yazd.

64 

Road transport in Iran
Transportation in Yazd Province